First Lady of Venezuela (Spanish: Primera Dama de Venezuela) is the unofficial title traditionally held by the wife of the president of Venezuela.

List of first ladies

Non-spouse first ladies

See also

 First Lady
 Venezuela
 List of presidents of Venezuela

Notes and references

Notes

References

  List of First Ladies of Venezuela - Venciclopedia
 “Las Presidentas de Venezuela, Primeras Damas de la República en el siglo XIX”, Antonio Reyes, 1955

 
First Ladies
Venezuela
First Ladies